Phosphila turbulenta, the turbulent phosphila, is a species of cutworm or dart moth in the family Noctuidae. It is found in North America.

The MONA or Hodges number for Phosphila turbulenta is 9618.

References

Further reading

External links

 

Noctuinae
Articles created by Qbugbot
Moths described in 1818